Walter Aloysius Lynch (July 7, 1894 in New York City – September 10, 1957 in Belle Harbor, Queens) was an American lawyer and politician originally from New York. From 1940 to 1951, he served six terms in the U.S. House of Representatives.

Early life
Lynch attended the Fordham Preparatory School and subsequently graduated from Fordham University in 1915, followed byFordham University School of Law in 1918, afterwards practicing law in New York City.

Start of career
He served as a temporary New York City magistrate in 1930. In 1938 Lynch was delegate to the New York state constitutional convention.

Congressman
He was elected Democrat to the 76th United States Congress to fill the vacancy caused by the death of Edward W. Curley, and was re-elected to the 77th, 78th, 79th, 80th and 81st United States Congresses, serving from February 20, 1940, to January 3, 1951.

Lynch was a delegate to the Democratic National Conventions of 1944 and 1948.

Candidate for governor
In 1950, Lynch was the Democratic nominee for Governor of New York, and was defeated in a landslide by the incumbent Governor Thomas E. Dewey.

Later career
In 1952, Lynch served as chairman of the New York State Democratic Committee.

Lynch was elected to the New York Supreme Court in 1954, and served from January 1955 until his death.

Death and burial
Lynch died at his summer home in Belle Harbor, Queens.  He wa buried at Gate of Heaven Cemetery in Hawthorne, New York.

Family
In 1920, Lynch married Claire Rosemary Mitchell (1895-1985).  They were the parents of sons Walter A. Lynch Jr. (1921-2017) and John Joseph Lynch (1928-1995).

Sources

Walter A. Lynch at The Political Graveyard

1894 births
1957 deaths
Fordham University alumni
Fordham University School of Law alumni
Public officeholders of Rockaway, Queens
New York Supreme Court Justices
Democratic Party members of the United States House of Representatives from New York (state)
20th-century American judges
20th-century American politicians
Fordham Preparatory School alumni